Nacho Libre is a video game for the Nintendo DS based upon the film of the same name. It was developed by Budcat Creations for Majesco Entertainment and released in 2006 in the US, and 2007 in Europe and Australia. The game was notable for its "Photo Puppety" art style, where still photos of characters from the film are used on 3D models.

Gameplay
In Majesco's Nacho Libre game , players can play as Nacho or more than 10 other luchadors, all with their own unique abilities. The game also features a range of over-the-top wrestling attacks, four play modes, themed Touch Screen mini-games, 4 player wireless matches and numerous arenas from the movie in which players can battle to be the ultimate Luchador.

Reception

The game received "mixed" reviews according to video game review aggregator Metacritic.

References

External links
Nacho Libre DS at Majesco

2006 video games
Majesco Entertainment games
Nintendo DS games
Nintendo DS-only games
Video games based on films
Video games developed in the United States
Professional wrestling games
Nickelodeon video games
Budcat Creations games
Multiplayer and single-player video games